Sthenias pseudodorsalis is a species of beetle in the family Cerambycidae. It was described by Stephan von Breuning in 1938. It is known from India, Nepal, Bhutan, and Laos.

References

pseudodorsalis
Beetles described in 1938